Olivier Lambert (born 3 May 1971) is a French former fencer. He competed in the team foil event at the 1992 Summer Olympics.

References

External links
 

1971 births
Living people
French male foil fencers
Olympic fencers of France
Fencers at the 1992 Summer Olympics
Sportspeople from Rennes